Ivo Andrić-Lužanski (born 1956) is a Croat politician of Bosnia and Herzegovina, a member of the Croatian Democratic Union of Bosnia and Herzegovina. 

He was born in Lug in 1956. He served twice as President of the Federation of Bosnia Herzegovina (1 January 1999 – 1 January 2000; 1 January 2001 – 28 February 2001). He served as Vice-President of the Federation of Bosnia and Herzegovina from 1 January 2000 to 1 January 2001.

Later he became a member of Croatian parliament.

References

1956 births
Living people
Croats of Bosnia and Herzegovina
Presidents of the Federation of Bosnia and Herzegovina
Vice Presidents of the Federation of Bosnia and Herzegovina
Politicians of the Federation of Bosnia and Herzegovina
Croatian Democratic Union of Bosnia and Herzegovina politicians
Representatives in the modern Croatian Parliament
Date of birth missing (living people)